Pedrosa de Duero is a municipality and town located in the province of Burgos, Castile and León, Spain. According to the 2004 census (INE), the municipality has a population of 501.

References

External links
 Pedrosa de Duero and its wineries (Spanish)

Municipalities in the Province of Burgos